Dicranidion is a genus comprising 13 species of fungi in the family Orbiliaceae.

Species
Dicranidion amazonense Matsush. 1981
Dicranidion argentinense Speg. 1910
Dicranidion dactylopagum (Drechsler) Peek & Solheim 1955
Dicranidion fissile K. Ando & Tubaki 1984
Dicranidion fragile Harkn. 1885
Dicranidion gracile Matsush. 1971
Dicranidion inaequale Tubaki & T. Yokoy. 1971
Dicranidion incarnatum (G.W. Martin) Peek & Solheim 1955
Dicranidion macrosporum Prasher, Manohar., Kunwar & D.K. Agarwal 2008
Dicranidion ontariense Matsush. 1987
Dicranidion palmicola Matsush. 1981
Dicranidion parapalmicola Matsush. 1993
Dicranidion tenue Matsush. 1993

References
http://www.indexfungorum.org

Helotiales